Yeni Göyçə (previously known as Saler) is a village and municipality in the Shamkir Rayon of Azerbaijan.  It has a population of 215.

References 

Populated places in Shamkir District